The 2000 Punta del Este Sevens was a Rugby Sevens tournament held in Punta del Este, Uruguay and was the third leg of the 1999-2000 World Sevens Series. The competition took place on 7 and 8 January at the Campus de Maldonado.

The hosts, Uruguay were eliminated in the Plate semi-finals. For the third consecutive event in the Series, the Cup final was contested between Fiji and New Zealand. The Punta del Este Sevens was not included on the World Sevens circuit for the 2000-01 series.

Teams
Sixteen national teams played in the tournament with New Zealand and Fiji being seeded one and two due to winning the previous two tournaments in Dubai and Stellenbosch. Peru were debuting on the world stage after becoming a member of the International Rugby Board as they were invited to compete in Punta del Este and Mar del Plata.

Format
The pool stage was played on the first day of the tournament. The 16 teams were separated into four pools of four teams and teams in the same pool played each other once. The top two teams in each pool advanced to the Cup quarterfinals to compete for the 2000 Punta del Este Sevens title.

Summary
The first day of the Punta del Este Sevens saw three teams end the day unbeaten from their pool stages. In Pool A, it was New Zealand who had an handful of players playing rugby sevens for the first time finishing top with victories over Spain (50–5), Peru (63–0) and Uruguay (24–5). Joint-leaders in the series heading into the round, Fiji only conceded twelve points in their group to finish top of the group with Canada coming in second place. The other team that finished unbeaten throughout Day 1 was Argentina who just slightly edged over Samoa, 19–12 in the fifth game of Pool D to finish top of the pool. Pool C was the only group to not have an unbeaten team with Chile forcing an tiebreaker after defeating South Africa 28–21. But Chile was the unlucky team with the team being the lowest in point average off the three teams.

The second day of the tournament saw the first extra time match in the series history with South Africa defeating Argentina 24–19 in the cup quarter final after they initially were locked at 19-all during regulation. After recording victories over South Africa and Samoa in the semi-finals respectively, New Zealand and Fiji met in the third consecutive cup final. During the final, an injury to Fijian player Waisele Serevi occurred in the 14th minute of the final with the score at 21–19. The injury saw New Zealand score three more tries and go to the top of the table with a 42–19 victory. Australia won the plate final for the third consecutive event defeating Canada while France took out the bowl defeating Germany.

Pool stage

Pool A

Source: World Rugby

Source: World Rugby

Pool B

Source: World Rugby

Source: World Rugby

Pool C

Source: World Rugby

Source: World Rugby

Pool D

Source: World Rugby

Source: World Rugby

Finals

Bowl

Source: World Rugby

Plate

Source: World Rugby

Cup

Source: World Rugby

Tournament placings

Source: Rugby7.com

References

2000
Punta del Este Sevens
rugby union